The flammulated treehunter (Thripadectes flammulatus) is a species of bird in the family Furnariidae. It is found in Colombia, Ecuador, Peru, and Venezuela. Its natural habitat is subtropical or tropical moist montane forest.

References

flammulated treehunter
Birds of the Colombian Andes
Birds of the Ecuadorian Andes
Birds of the Venezuelan Andes
Birds of the Sierra Nevada de Santa Marta
flammulated treehunter
flammulated treehunter
Taxonomy articles created by Polbot